Penthea tigrina is a species of beetle in the family Cerambycidae. It was described by Thomas Blackburn in 1901. It is known from Australia.

References

Pteropliini
Beetles described in 1901
Taxa named by Thomas Blackburn (entomologist)